Markus Schmidt may refer to:

 Markus Schmidt (luger) (born 1968), Austrian luger
 Markus Schmidt (referee) (born 1973), German referee
 Markus Schmidt (footballer) (born 1977), Austrian footballer